Folketing elections were held in Denmark on 24 April 1929, except in the Faroe Islands where they were held on 29 May. The Social Democratic Party remained the largest in the Folketing, with 61 of the 149 seats. Voter turnout was 79.7% in Denmark proper and 58.0% in the Faroes. Social Democrat Thorvald Stauning returned to the Prime Ministership by forming a coalition government with the Social Liberals, a position he would hold until 1942.

Results

References

Elections in Denmark
Denmark
Folketing
Denmark